Cadaverous Condition are an extreme metal band from Austria, founded in 1990 by René Kramer and Wolfgang Weiss. 
Their style ranges from old school death metal to acoustic guitar songs with typical death metal growl vocals the band themselves describe as "Death Folk".

Members
 Wolfgang Weiss
 René Kramer
 Peter Droneberger
 Paul Droneberger

Discography

Albums
 In Melancholy (1993)
 "For Love" I Said (1995)
 The Lesser Travelled Seas (2001)
 To The Night Sky (2006)
 Burn Brightly Alone (2011)

Live albums
Live (2002, CDr)

Compilations
Nostalgia (diary 1990-1999) (2001, tape)
The Past Is Another Country (2004, CDr)
Songs For The Crooked Path (2007)

Splits
Tryst (1997, split CD with Todd Dillingham)
Time (2004, split 10" vinyl with CHANGES)

EPs
Eisbär 90210 (1995, CD EP)
What The Waves Were Always Saying (2003, CDr)

Remix album / Collaboration
Destroying The Night Sky (2008, remix album featuring Thighpaulsandra, Andrew Liles, Nocturnal Emissions, Product 8, Colin Potter, Nurse with Wound, Gjöll, Holy McGrail, Asmus Tietchens, Controlled Bleeding, Ali Helnwein)

References

Encyclopaedia Metallum - Cadaverous Condition

External links
Cadaverous Condition official website
Cadaverous Condition on Myspace
Cadaverous Condition on Facebook
Cadaverous Condition on YouTube
Cadaverous Condition on Bandcamp

Austrian death metal musical groups